Chiang Rai International School curriculum is based on the California State Standards at all levels to provide clear objectives for learning that will prepare students to enter universities where the primary mode of instruction is English.

Location and facilities
The school is situated approximately 3 km north of the city of Chiang Rai in Rim Kok district. It caters to day students from Chiang Rai and to boarders from all over the world. Its boarding program offers students academic support and cultural, outdoor, leadership and sporting opportunities. The facilities include Playground, Swimming Pool, Play Area, Gymnasium, Auditorium, Science Labs, Tennis Courts, Library, ICT, Soccer Field, Golf Courses, Music Room, School Shop.

International schools in Thailand
Chiang Rai province
Education in Chiang Rai province
Boarding schools in Thailand
Private schools in Thailand
Educational institutions established in 2010
2010 establishments in Thailand